Francisco Rogério Santos (born 5 September 1998) is a Portuguese swimmer. He competed in the men's 100 metre backstroke at the 2020 Summer Olympics.

References

External links
 

1998 births
Living people
People from Alcobaça, Portugal
Portuguese male backstroke swimmers
Olympic swimmers of Portugal
Swimmers at the 2020 Summer Olympics
Sportspeople from Leiria District
Mediterranean Games competitors for Portugal
Swimmers at the 2018 Mediterranean Games
Swimmers at the 2022 Mediterranean Games